The .256 Gibbs Magnum is an obsolete rimless bottleneck centerfire rifle cartridge developed by George Gibbs of Bristol and introduced in 1913.

Overview
The .256 Gibbs Magnum was designed and introduced by George Gibbs in 1913 for use in their own Mauser style sporting rifles. The cartridge was created by reducing the neck of the 6.5×57mm Mauser by 2 mm.

The .256 Gibbs Magnum is very similar to, but not interchangeable with, the 6.5×55mm Swedish cartridge.

One famous user of the .256 Gibbs Magnum was Denis D. Lyell who used a rifle in this calibre for hunting in Africa.

See also
 List of rifle cartridges

References

External links
 Ammo-One, ".256 Gibbs Magnum", ammo-one.com, retrieved 4 February 2018.
 Cartridgecollector, ".256 Gibbs", cartridgecollector.net, retrieved 4 February 2018.
 George Gibbs Ltd, "History", gibbsgunmakers.com, retrieved 4 February 2018.
 Imperial War Museums, "6.5 X 55: Kynoch; .256 Gibbs Magnum, Hollow Point", iwm.org.uk, retrieved 4 February 2018.
 The Spanish Association of Cartridge Collectors, ".256 Gibbs Magnum", municion.org , retrieved 4 February 2018.

Pistol and rifle cartridges
British firearm cartridges
George Gibbs cartridges
Weapons and ammunition introduced in 1913